John Steven "Jay" Kordich (August 27, 1923 – May 27, 2017) was an American author and advocate of juicing and juice fasting. Kordich was best known as the "Juiceman" and the "Father of Juicing" in the United States.

Biography
Kordich played college football for the University of Southern California (USC) in 1948 and was drafted in the 22nd round of the 1949 NFL draft by the Green Bay Packers. Before Kordich could sign with the Packers, it was reported that he was diagnosed with inoperable bladder cancer.

Kordich authored The New York Times best seller The Juiceman's Power of Juicing, first published in 1992. He was involved in advertising a series of juicers, including the Juiceman Juicer. He lectured on the subject and appeared in television infomercials for the Juiceman Juicer. The product was one of the first products and brands to be sold through the infomercial format at the peak of the juicing craze in the summer of 1992. It was marketed by Rick Cesari's Trillium HealthProducts, which had more than $100 million in sales attributed in part to the direct marketing of the Juiceman Juicer. In 2011, Kordich developed the Jay Kordich PowerGrind Pro juicer.

In 1992, Consumer Reports tested Kordich's Juiceman II extractor and concluded that other competitive models were easier to clean, cheaper, and worked better. Kordich's health claims in regard to juicing have been disputed by medical experts. For example, Kordich stated that he was influenced by the Gerson diet and was cured of cancer when he was 20 by consuming 13 glasses of apple and carrot juice each day.

Stephen Barrett of Quackwatch noted that Kordich made far-fetched, nonsensical, and unproven health claims about juicing. These included his belief that uncooked foods flush the body of toxins (detoxification), and that juicing can treat many illnesses such as anemia, anxiety, arthritis, gallstones, impotence, and heart disease.

Kordich promoted a raw vegan diet.

Death
On May 27, 2017, Kordich died at 8:30pm due to breathing problems. He was 93.

Popular culture
The Juiceman Juicer and Jay Kordich were parodied by Jim Carrey on the popular skit show In Living Color.

Selected publications
The Juice Advantage (1992)
The Juiceman's Power of Juicing (1992, 2007)

References

External links
 
 

1923 births
2017 deaths
People from San Pedro, Los Angeles
Alternative cancer treatment advocates
Alternative detoxification promoters
American health and wellness writers
American veganism activists
Fasting advocates
Pseudoscientific diet advocates
Raw foodists
20th-century American non-fiction writers